Sir Alexander Murray, Lord of Culbin and Newton, was a Scottish noble. He was the eldest son of Richard de Moravia (Richard Murray of Culbin) and Margery de Lascelles.

He is known to have married Eva, whose parentage is currently unknown. Eva remarried after Alexander's death to Alexander Comyn of Dunphail.

It is recorded that Alexander had two sons: John, and Murdoch.

Castle and lands

As heir to his father Richard, he inherited Skelbo Castle, Culbin and Newton. Further lands were inherited from his mother Marjorie and maternal uncle Duncan Lascelles. Alexander held Wester Beath in Fife.

Notes

References

Year of birth unknown
Year of death unknown
13th-century Scottish people